The 60th Writers Guild of America Awards honored the best film, television, and videogame writers of 2007. Winners were announced on February 9, 2008.

Winners and nominees

Film

Best Adapted Screenplay
 No Country for Old Men  - Joel Coen and Ethan Coen (screenplay); Cormac McCarthy (author)
Into the Wild - Sean Penn (screenplay); Jon Krakauer (author)
Le scaphandre et le papillon (The Diving Bell and the Butterfly) - Ronald Harwood (screenplay); Jean-Dominique Bauby (author)
There Will Be Blood - Paul Thomas Anderson (screenplay); Upton Sinclair (author)
Zodiac - James Vanderbilt (screenplay); Robert Graysmith (author)

Best Original Screenplay
 Juno  - Diablo Cody
Knocked Up - Judd Apatow
Lars and the Real Girl - Nancy Oliver
Michael Clayton - Tony Gilroy
The Savages - Tamara Jenkins

Best Documentary Feature Screenplay
 Taxi to the Dark Side  - Alex Gibney
The Camden 28 - Anthony Giacchino
Nanking - Elisabeth Bentley, Bill Guttentag, Dan Sturman, and Elisabeth Bentley; story by Bill Guttentag and Dan Sturman
No End in Sight - Charles Ferguson
The Rape of Europa - Richard Berge, Nicole Newnham, and Bonni Cohen
Sicko - Michael Moore

Television

Dramatic Series

Comedy Series

New Series

Episodic Drama

Episodic Comedy

Long Form - Original

Long Form - Adaptation

Animation

Comedy/Variety (Including Talk) Series

Daytime Serials

Children's

Episodic & specials

Script - long form or special

Documentary

Current events

Other than current events

News

Regularly scheduled, bulletin or breaking report

Analysis, feature, or commentary

Video games

Videogame Writing
 Dead Head Fred  - Dave Ellis and Adam Cogan
Crash of the Titans - Christopher Mitchell
The Simpsons Game - Lead writer Matt Selman, written by Tim Long and Matt Warburton, dialogue by Jeff Poliquin
The Witcher - Lead story designer Artur Ganszyniec, dialogue by Sebastian Stepien, additional dialogue by Marcin Blacha, writers Sande Chen and Anne Toole
World in Conflict - Story design by Christofer Emgard, story consultant Larry Bond, script consultant Ed Zuckerman

References

 

2007
W
Writers Guild of America
W
Writers Guild of America Awards
2007 in American cinema
2007 in American television
Writers Guild of America Awards